The California Floristic Province (CFP) is a floristic province with a Mediterranean-type climate located on the Pacific Coast of North America with a distinctive flora similar to other regions with a winter rainfall and summer drought climate like the Mediterranean Basin. This biodiversity hotspot is known for being the home of the Sierran giant sequoia tree and its close relative the coast redwood. In 1996, the Province was designated as a biodiversity hotspot allowing it to join ranks among 33 other areas in the world with many endemic species. To be named a biodiversity hotspot, an area has to contain species and plant life that cannot be found anywhere else in the world. The California Floristic Province is home to over 3,000 species of vascular plants, 60% of which are endemic to the province.

The California Floristic Province belongs to the Madrean Region of the Holarctic (or Boreal) Floristic Kingdom. As part of the Madrean Region, it is bordered on its east by the Great Basin Floristic Province, and to the south and southwest by the Sonoran Province (which includes the Mojave, Colorado, Sonoran, and Baja California Deserts). To the north, the region is bordered by the Vancouverian Province of the Rocky Mountain Region, and much of coastal and mountain Northern California and southwestern Oregon are defined as falling into either province depending on a given author's delimitations.

The province is bordered by, and sometimes defined as partly coincident with, the Rocky Mountain Floristic Region in the north. This boundary is poorly defined as some leading geobotanists, including Robert F. Thorne (Flora of North America) and Armen Takhtajan, include Oregon and Northern California within the Rocky Mountain Province.

The California Floristic Province is a world biodiversity hotspot as defined by Conservation International, due to an unusually high concentration of endemic plants: approximately 8,000 plant species in the geographic region, and over 3,400 taxa limited to the CFP proper, as well as having lost over 70% of its primary vegetation. A biodiversity hotspot contains irreplaceable areas to the plants and animals that live there. Among these unique regions, almost every one of them is subject to their exclusive species being at greater risk from the impact of humans. The greatest threat to this area is wilderness destruction caused by large commercial farming industries and the heavy expansion of urban areas. Conservation International proposed a strategy in 1998, to focus more specifically on areas of the California Floristic Province that contained the most human impact in order to lower the threat to the region. The issues that are causing the most threats to this province include but are not limited to population pressures, loss of habitat, unsustainable resource use, and introduced non-native species.

Climate and topography 
The California Floristic Province is one of the five biodiversity hotspots with Mediterranean climates, and it is characterized by hot, dry summers and cool, wet winters. Many parts of the coastal areas of this hotspot, being moderated by the ocean, experience cool summers due to the regular occurrence of ocean fog, which sustains redwood forests amongst other communities.

In California, the province includes most of the state excluding the Modoc Plateau, Great Basin and deserts in the southeastern part of the state. In Oregon, the province includes the coastal mountains south of Cape Blanco and most of the Rogue River watershed.

In Baja California, the province includes the forest and chaparral belts of the Sierra Juarez and the Sierra San Pedro Martir (but excluding their desert slopes to the east), coastal areas south to about El Rosario, and Guadalupe Island.

In Nevada, the CFP includes the region of the Sierra in the vicinity of Lake Tahoe, with the eastern border with the Great Basin corresponding roughly to the location of Reno-Carson City.

Parts of the following mountain ranges are included in the province:
 The Klamath Mountains
 The Cascade Range
 The Coast Ranges
 The Sierra Nevada
 The Transverse Ranges
 The Peninsular ranges south into Baja California

The Great Central Valley is also within the CFP.

California plant communities 
Numerous plant communities exist in California and botanists have attempted to structure them into identifiable vegetation types groupings. Robert Ornduff and colleagues Phyllis M. Faber and Todd Keeler-Wolf did much work on this problem, and in the 2003 Natural History Guide Introduction to California Plant Life  established a cohesive set of titles to identify California plant communities based on but somewhat different from those earlier established by California botanist Philip A. Munz.

Broken into three large groupings based on geography, the Ornduff scheme includes :
the Cismontane ("this side of the mountain") west of the Sierra Nevada or San Jacinto Mountains, or North of the Transverse Ranges, Montane, and Transmontane ("the other side of the mountain"), in the rainshadow of these ranges, typically desert.

Cismontane region 
 Coastal Strand (same in Munz)
 Coastal Prairie (same in Munz)
 Coastal Salt Marsh (same in Munz)
 Chaparral (Hard Chaparral) (same in Munz)
 Closed-Cone Pine Forest (same in Munz)
 Coastal Sage Scrub (Soft Chaparral) (same in Munz)
 Freshwater marsh (same in Munz)
 Maritime Coast Range Ponderosa Pine forests
 Montane Chaparral (not in Munz)
 North Coastal Forest (includes North Coastal Coniferous Forest, Redwood Forest, Douglas-fir Forest and Mixed Evergreen Forest (from Munz) )
 Northern Coastal Scrub (same in Munz)
 Riparian Woodland (same in Munz)
 Valley and Foothill Woodland (includes Northern, Southern Oak Woodland, Foothill Woodland)
 Valley Grassland (same in Munz)

Montane region 
 Montane Coniferous Forest (Yellow Pine in Munz)
 Montane Chaparral (not in Munz)
 Subalpine Forest (Red Fir Forest, Lodgepole Pine Forest, Bristlecone Pine and Subalpine Forest)
 Montane Meadow (not in Munz)
 Alpine Fell-field (same in Munz)

Transmontane region 
 Pinyon-Juniper Woodland (Includes Northern Juniper Woodland, Pinyon-Juniper Woodland (both in Munz))
 Sagebrush Scrub (same in Munz)
 Shadscale Scrub (same in Munz)
 Alkali Sink Scrub (same in Munz)
 Joshua Tree Woodland (same in Munz)
 Creosote Bush Woodland (same in Munz)

Endemic species and ecosystems 
The hotspot presents a higher level of endemism in plants than in animals. Of the 7,031 vascular plants (species, subspecies or varieties) found in the hotspot, 2,153 taxa (in 25 genera) are endemic, meaning they are found nowhere else. About 80,000 km², or 24.7% of the original vegetation remains in relatively pristine conditions today.

The six largest plant families in California by number of species (40% of all species of vascular plants) are:
 Asteraceae
 Poaceae
 Fabaceae
 Scrophulariaceae
 Brassicaceae
 Cyperaceae

The province notably has giant sequoia forests, California oak woodlands (all native oaks in this ecosystem are endemic, with the exception of Quercus garryana which ranges into southwestern British Columbia) and redwood forests. Other ecosystems include sagebrush steppes, prickly pear shrublands, coastal sage scrub, chaparral, juniper-pine woodland, upper montane-subalpine forests, alpine forests, riparian forests, cypress forests, mixed evergreen forests, and Douglas fir forests, coastal dunes, mudflats and salt marshes.

A few examples of plants that are endemic to the province and are also endangered species are:
 Baker's larkspur
 Gowen cypress
 Hickman's potentilla
 Point Reyes bird's beak
 Santa Cruz tarplant
 Santa Rosa Island manzanita

Threatened and endangered 
Agriculture and urban expansion are encroaching upon remaining habitats in the California Floristic Province. Commercial farming in the region generates half of all agricultural products consumed by the United States population. The large farms that grow from this demand cause the greater loss of the biodiversity hotspot's natural un-renewable resources. California has one of the highest human populations rendering it one of the four most ecologically degraded expanses in the United States. Other threats include invasive species colonisation, strip mining, oil extraction,  air pollution, soil contamination, livestock grazing, wildfires (excessive heat or frequency types), and construction of building developments and roads. Global warming presents future threats. Research done by United States Ecologist, Dr. Erik Beever, suggests that global warming may have had a hand in the local extinction of the pika populations in the Great Basin area east of the Sierra Nevada. More research proposes that as the temperature keeps rising, alpine species will begin to migrate north looking for cooler climates that can support more of a sustainable habitat. Reducing emissions from the burning of fossil fuels such as coal, oil, and gas is the first step in the fight against global warming.

Conservation efforts
Biodiversity hotspots face the highest threats due to the fact that their resources and animal or plant species cannot be replicated or found in any other regions on the planet. Conservation efforts receive little to no funding to put toward the protection of these extremely distinctive hotspots. So establishing priorities on where to focus efforts is essential. In 1988, British Ecologist, Norman Myers discovered the ten tropical hotspots that contained endemic species. Then, in 1990, Myers added eight more hotspots to the list, one of which was the California Floristic Province. Due to Meyer's extensive research into the biodiversity of these hotspots, Conservation International began a major assessment of these regions in 1996. It is not until 1999, however, that Conservation International finally sets restrictions on what makes up the criteria for a biodiversity hotspot. The California Floristic Province contained more than 1,500 endemic species of vascular plants and had lost at least 70% of its original natural habitat, and so it became the eighth ranked hotspot in the world. As a result, 37% of the province is now under official protection. California had spent more money on the conservation of these precious lands than any other state in America. The conservation efforts created to protect the California Floristic Province would not be possible without the major contributions from organizations such as the Sierra Club, Nature Conservancy, Wilderness Society and the California Native Plant Society.

See also
 List of California native plants
 Madrean Region

References

Further reading
 Ornduff, R., Faber, P. M. & Keeler-Wolf, T. 2003. Introduction to California Plant Life. Revised edition. University of California Press
 California Floristic Province, Smithsonian National Museum of Natural History
 California Floristic Province, Biodiversity Hotspots, Conservation International

Floristic provinces
Madrean Region
 

 
 
 CA
01
01
Holarctic